Berntson is a surname. Notable people with the surname include:

Eric Berntson (1941–2018), Canadian politician
Gary Berntson (born 1945), American professor of psychology
Sofia Berntson (born 1979), Swedish singer

See also
Berntsen
Berntsson